The Military ranks of Guyana are the military insignia used by the Guyana Defence Force. Guyana shares a rank structure similar to that of the United Kingdom.

Commissioned officer ranks
The rank insignia of commissioned officers.

Former insignia

Other ranks
The rank insignia of non-commissioned officers and enlisted personnel.

References

External links
 

Guyana
Military of Guyana